Lanivet and Blisland was an electoral division of Cornwall in the United Kingdom which returned one member to sit on Cornwall Council between 2013 and 2021. It was abolished at the 2021 local elections, being succeeded by Lanivet, Blisland and Bodmin St Lawrence.

Councillors

Extent
Lanivet and Blisland represented the villages of Withiel, Lanivet, Nanstallon, Helland, Blisland, Temple and Cardinham, and the hamlets of Retire, Withielgoose, Pendrift, Waterloo, Millpool, Bunny's Hill, Little Downs, Newton, Trebyan and Tregullon. The village of Ruthernbridge was shared with the St Issey and St Tudy division, the hamlet of St Lawrence was shared with the Bodmin St Mary's division, the hamlet of Fletchersbridge was shared with the Bodmin St Petroc division, and the village of Mount was shared with the St Cleer division. The division covered 13,162 hectares in total.

Election results

2017 election

2013 election

References

Electoral divisions of Cornwall Council